John Joseph Carty (April 14, 1861 – December 27, 1932) was an American electrical engineer and a major contributor to the development of telephone wires and related technology. He was a recipient of the Edison Medal.  As Chief Engineer of AT&T, he was instrumental in the development of the first transcontinental telephone line. Carty was president of the American Institute of Electrical Engineers from 1915 to 1916.

He died at Johns Hopkins Hospital in Baltimore on December 27, 1932.

Honors
 Edward Longstreth Medal of the Franklin Institute (1905)
 Fellow of the American Academy of Arts and Sciences (1915)
 Trustee of the Carnegie Institution (1916–1932)
 IEEE Edison Medal (1917)
 Franklin Medal of the Franklin Institute (1916)
 John J. Carty Award of the National Academy of Sciences (1932)(inaugural)

See also
John J. Carty Award for the Advancement of Science

References

External links

 
 Carty Award
 
National Academy of Sciences Biographical Memoir

1861 births
1932 deaths
People from Cambridge, Massachusetts
IEEE Edison Medal recipients
American electrical engineers
Fellows of the American Academy of Arts and Sciences
John Fritz Medal recipients